Bajoqueta rock is a Spanish rock group who sings in valencian and founded in 1986 in Riba-roja de Túria. The band is very popular in Valencian Community and Catalonia cause they eccentricals village lyrics with a huge sense of humor.

Discography 
 A pèl (1998)
 Amb dos pinyols (2001)
 Retruqu3 (2004)
 Ie, el de l'oli (2010)

External links 

 Website

Spanish rock music groups
Musicians from the Valencian Community